Virbac is a French company dedicated to animal health located in Carros, near Nice. It was founded in 1968 by veterinarian Pierre-Richard Dick.

The company is the 6th the largest veterinarian pharmaceutical group with a turnover of 948 million euros in 2020 (59% companion animal and 41% food producing animal). The company is a limited company with a board Euronext Paris stock exchange - compartiment A and is part of the reference index: SBF 120, and eligible SRD, PEA and PEA-PME.

History
Veterinarians Pierre-Richard Dick and Max Rombi founded Virbac (acronym of virology and bacteriology) in 1968 as a veterinary office in the Cap 3000 mall in Nice. The office was sold two years later, after which Dick and Rombi focussed on animal drugs for pets, distinguishing Virbac from large veterinary pharmaceutical companies that specialised in livestock.

At the end of the 1970s, Rombi began the subsidiary Arkovet, from where he developed Arkopharma, specialising in phyto- and nutrition therapy.

International growth
Virbac went international in 1970 with the establishment of offices in Egypt and Spain. Subsidiaries followed in Germany (1982), Italy (1986), Brazil (1987), Australia (1987), Japan (1992), Belgium (1994), Mexico (1998), the United States of America (1999), and Poland (2011).

Pierre-Richard Dick dies at sea at the age of 55. After his death in 1992, his family decided to keep the company.

In January 2015, Virbac finalized the acquisition of two antiparasitic products for 410 million euros from Eli Lilly, which had acquired the veterinary activities of Novartis.

Activities

The company has 4,900 employees and is present in over 100 countries with 33 sales subsidiaries. Its production is located in 10 countries among which France, the US, Mexico, Brazil, Vietnam. It also has eight research and development centers located in the United States, Mexico, Chile, Uruguay, France, Vietnam, Taiwan and Australia. It generates nearly 88% of its revenues outside France.

Its product range is designed to cover the main pathologies in companion animals and livestock: internal and external parasiticides (collars and pipettes), antibiotics, vaccines, diagnostic tests, dog and cat nutrition, dermatology, dental hygiene, reproductive, aquaculture, anesthesia, geriatrics and electronic identification (pets, horses, exotic pets…).

References

 Virbac group website
 2014 annual report

Pharmaceutical companies of France
Veterinary medicine companies
Pharmaceutical companies established in 1968
1968 establishments in France
Companies based in Provence-Alpes-Côte d'Azur
French brands
Companies listed on Euronext Paris